Multyfarnham is a village in County Westmeath, Ireland.

Multyfarnham may also refer to:

Places
Republic of Ireland
Multyfarnham (civil parish), a civil parish in the barony of Corkaree, County Westmeath
Multyfarnham or Fearbranagh, a townland spanning Stonehall and Tyfarnham civil parishes, barony of Corkaree, County Westmeath
Multyfarnham (townland), a townland in Multyfarnham civil parish, barony of Corkaree, County Westmeath

See also
Multyfarnham Friary